The 1978 Spanish motorcycle Grand Prix was the second round of the 1978 Grand Prix motorcycle racing season. It took place on the weekend of 14–16 April 1978 at the Circuito Permanente del Jarama.

Classification

500 cc

250cc

125cc classification

50cc classification

References

Spanish motorcycle Grand Prix
Spain
Motorcycle Grand Prix